Camerata Nuova is a  (municipality) in the Metropolitan City of Rome in the Italian region of Lazio, located about  east of Rome.

Camerata Nuova borders the following municipalities: Cappadocia, Cervara di Roma, Rocca di Botte, Subiaco, Vallepietra.

References

Cities and towns in Lazio